That Pesky Rat is a British children's picture book written and illustrated by Lauren Child and published by Orchard UK in 2002. It won the Nestlé Smarties Book Prize in ages category 6–8 years and it was commended runner up for the Kate Greenaway Medal from the professional librarians, recognising the year's best-illustrated British children's book.

Candlewick Press published a US edition in the same year.

In 2008, a special UNESCO edition was published in the UK.  All author and publisher profits from this book now go to support UNESCO projects around the world.

Plot
The story is narrated by a rat who wishes he could live the life of a proper pet. He visits several friends who are proper pets, including a chinchilla and a cat. However, he doesn't like the way any of them live. In the end, he puts up signs, asking if there is any one who wants a rat as a pet, and goes to a pet store. He is finally taken home from the store by an old man with poor eyesight who sees him in the display window and mistakes him for a cat. In the end, the rat says that he doesn't mind pretending to be a cat and that he likes his life as a pet.

Notes

References

External links

  —immediately, first US edition 

2002 children's books
British children's books
British picture books
Children's fiction books
Books about mice and rats
Chinchilla
Books about cats
Orchard Books books